The 2011 Singapore Super Series was the fifth super series tournament of the 2011 BWF Super Series. The tournament was held in Singapore from 14 to 19 June 2011 and had a total purse of $200,000.

Men's singles

Seeds

  Taufik Hidayat
  Lin Dan
  Chen Long
  Peter Gade
  Boonsak Ponsana
  Nguyễn Tiến Minh
  Bao Chunlai
  Park Sung-hwan

Top half

Bottom half

Finals

Women's singles

Seeds

  Wang Shixian
  Wang Yihan
  Wang Xin
  Saina Nehwal
  Bae Youn-joo
  Tine Baun
  Porntip Buranaprasertsuk
  Juliane Schenk

Top half

Bottom half

Finals

Men's doubles

Seeds

  Mathias Boe / Carsten Mogensen
  Jung Jae-sung / Lee Yong-dae
  Ko Sung-hyun / Yoo Yeon-seong
  Cai Yun / Fu Haifeng
  Fang Chieh-min / Lee Sheng-mu
  Markis Kido / Hendra Setiawan
  Chai Biao / Guo Zhendong
  Muhammad Ahsan / Bona Septano

Top half

Bottom half

Finals

Women's doubles

Seeds

  Miyuki Maeda / Satoko Suetsuna
  Mizuki Fujii / Reika Kakiiwa
  Meiliana Jauhari / Greysia Polii
  Shizuka Matsuo / Mami Naito
  Tian Qing / Zhao Yunlei
  Ha Jung-eun / Kim Min-jung
  Duanganong Aroonkesorn / Kunchala Voravichitchaikul
  Valeria Sorokina / Nina Vislova

Top half

Bottom half

Finals

Mixed doubles

Seeds

  Zhang Nan / Zhao Yunlei
  Sudket Prapakamol / Saralee Thoungthongkam
  Joachim Fischer Nielsen / Christinna Pedersen
  Tantowi Ahmad / Lilyana Natsir
  Thomas Laybourn / Kamilla Rytter Juhl
  Tao Jiaming / Tian Qing
  Robert Mateusiak / Nadiezda Zieba
  Songphon Anugritayawon / Kunchala Voravichitchaikul

Top half

Bottom half

Finals

References

2011 Singapore Super Series
Singapore Super Series
Singapore